The African Footballer of the Year award, presented to the best African footballer each year, has been conferred by the Confederation of African Football (CAF) since 1992. An earlier African Footballer of the Year Golden Ball award was given out between 1970 and 1994 by France Football magazine. The changes resulted in parallel Golden Ball awards given out to Abedi Pele and George Weah in 1993 and 1994 by the magazine although the CAF sponsored awards for those years were won respectively by Rashidi Yekini and Emmanuel Amuneke, as well as two awards given to Abedi Pele in 1992. France Football discontinued the election from 1995 after the European Ballon d'Or – also awarded by the magazine – had been opened to all players in the European leagues.

In 1991 the magazine Afrique Football installed an award. It was discontinued in 2003.

Samuel Eto'o and Yaya Touré have won the award the most times (4 wins each), Two-time winner Didier Drogba is the player with the most runner-up appearances (4), most third place finishes (3), and most times in the top three (9). The France born Frédéric Kanouté, Riyad Mahrez and Pierre-Emerick Aubameyang are the only European-born players to win the award (both Kanouté and Aubameyang initially featured for France's U21 squad before going on to represent Mali and Gabon, respectively).

Winners

France Football award (1970–1994)

 

The award by France Football magazine was awarded to the best African footballer between 1970 and 1994. The award was discontinued in 1995 after the European Footballer of the Year (Ballon d'Or) was opened to players of non-European nationality, the award being given to George Weah that year. It had already been replaced by an official award given out by the Confederation of African Football since 1992.

Afrique Football award (Etoile d'Or) (1991–2003)

CAF award (1992–present)

Multiple winners
* Players in bold are currently active

Awards won by nationality

Awards won by club

See also

 BBC African Footballer of the Year
 CAF Awards
 List of sport awards

References

 
France Football awards 
Confederation of African Football trophies and awards]
African football trophies and awards
Africa